Astragalus umbraticus is a species of milkvetch known by the common name Bald Mountain milkvetch.

It is native to western Oregon and northwestern California, where it grows in the woodlands of the coastal Klamath Mountains, Outer Northern California Coast Ranges, and Oregon Coast Ranges.

Description
Astragalus umbraticus is an erect, branching perennial herb growing up to 50 centimeters tall. The leaves are up to 12 centimeters long and made up of many oblong or rounded leaflets.

The inflorescence is an array of 10 to 25 greenish white flowers. The fruit is a curving legume pod drying to a thick, papery texture and black color.

External links
Jepson Manual Treatment
USDA Plants Profile
Photo gallery

umbraticus
Flora of California
Flora of Oregon
Flora of the Klamath Mountains
Natural history of the California Coast Ranges
Oregon Coast Range
Flora without expected TNC conservation status